Anna is a city in the U.S. state of Texas. Located in Collin County, its population was 16,896 at the 2020 U.S. census.

History
Following the American Civil War, the Houston and Texas Central Railway resumed laying track north from Corsicana and passed through the area in 1872. By the time Anna was platted in 1883, it had a population of 20, two stores, a steam gristmill, and a Baptist church. A post office also opened in that year. In 1885, the railroad built a depot.

By 1890 the town had a population of nearly 200. Anna was incorporated in 1913, with John L. Greer as first mayor.

Local historian Chester A. Howell compiled a brief history of Anna for inclusion in a book, A Town Named Anna, that was given to those who attended the Anna school homecoming on October 19, 1985. A one-page list of errata to correct some minor errors was added in 1989. In 2018, the Anna Area Historical Preservation Society published, "The Spark That Ignited The Town Of Anna", a collection of stories and pictures of early Anna, Texas.

The Houston and Texas Central Railway extended its track in a north–south route several miles east of Mantua in 1872. Mantua soon declined in favor of the new railroad towns of Van Alstyne (Grayson County) and Anna which developed here in early 1880s.

Namesake
The town was named in honor of Miss Anna Quinlan, daughter of George A. Quinlan, superintendent of the Houston and Texas Central Railroad.
Anna Elizabeth Quinlan was born on September 8, 1878, to George Austin Quinlan and Mary Kate (Saunders) Quinlan. She had one sibling, George Austin Quinlan, Jr. born October 10, 1880. Anna married Edward Tom Randle of Dallas on June 2, 1902, in Washington, D.C. Edward was an attorney and, they moved to Dallas following his graduation from Georgetown College. Edward died on December 1, 1918. Following her husband’s death, Anna moved to Wauwatosa, Wisconsin, and later to Libertyville, Illinois, apparently to be near her brother, George. Anna never remarried and died childless in 1952.

First Christian Church of Anna

Liberty Christian Church (Disciples of Christ), one of the earliest Christian Churches in Texas, was founded in northern Collin County by pioneer settlers Collin McKinney and J. B. Wilmeth in 1846. In 1854, a Christian seminary was established by members of the Liberty congregation about two miles northwest of Anna in the (then) newly established community of Mantua.

According to local tradition Mantua's Christian congregation split between the two new communities. Former Mantua church members and early Anna resident Rebecca Sherley helped organize the First Christian Church of Anna in 1882. The Rev. Alf Douglas served as first Pastor. Services were held in the Sherley home until it burned in 1886. About 1890 the sanctuary was built here at the site of the former Sherley home. Major additions to the rear of the sanctuary were completed in 1949.

A. Sherley and Brother Hardware Store

Lewis and Pauline Sherley moved to north Texas from Kentucky about 1853. Their grandsons, brothers Andrew and William Sherley, opened a hardware store in 1894. William Sherley died in 1894 and, his son, Fred bought out his father's share of the store. It remained in the family after the store closed in 1979. Over time they were undertakers as well as purveyors of furniture, farming implements and machinery, wagons, cotton, grain and groceries. Wagon-weighing scales in front of the building were removed when the road was widened. The structure is a fine example of an early Texas commercial building, retaining the original canopy and painted signs. Minimal Victorian-era detailing includes corbelled brickwork in the parapet and paneled kickplates on storefront display windows.

Tornado
The second tornado (F3) touched down in neighboring Westminster and Whitewright, destroying many homes and killing three. During the disaster, several volunteers from Collin County Amateur Radio Services worked with the National Weather Service in a Skywarn net. The Anna police and fire departments along with the American Red Cross opened Anna High School up as a shelter to the "walking wounded" and anyone who needed a place to stay due to the road blockages and damage in that area. The tornadoes could be seen from Anna, Van Alstyne, and Melissa, and power was knocked out to several homes in the area.

Geography

Climate 
The climate in this area is characterized by relatively high temperatures and evenly distributed precipitation throughout the year.  The Köppen climate classification system describes the weather as humid subtropical, Cfa.

Demographics

As of the 2020 United States census, there were 16,896 people, 4,450 households, and 3,792 families residing in the city.

Notable people 

 Ralph Fults (1911–1993), outlaw and associate of the Barrow gang
 Curley Johnson (1935-2016), American football player
 Kewpie Morgan (1892–1956), American silent film comedian

References

External links
 City of Anna official website
 

Cities in Collin County, Texas
Cities in Texas
Dallas–Fort Worth metroplex
Populated places established in 1867